Viljormur í Heiðunum Davidsen (born 19 July 1991) is a Faroese professional footballer who plays as a left-back for Faroe Islands Premier League club HB Torshavn and the Faroe Islands national team.

Club career
Davidsen started his career with FC Fyn in the Danish 1st Division. He had a brief stint at NSÍ Runavík in 2012, but only played three matches, transferring to Norwegian club FK Jerv. After that, he returned to Denmark, moving to FC Fredericia for the remainder of the 2012–13 season.

In August 2013, Davidsen moved to Vejle Boldklub, where he became a key player, making more than 200 appearances for the club.

On 17 January 2022, Davidsen signed a two-year contract with newly-promoted Allsvenskan club Helsingborgs IF. Although he received the club's captain armband during his spell in Sweden, he faced relegation at the end of the 2022 season. In November of the same year, he terminated his contract with the club by mutual consent.

On 5 January 2023, Davidsen officially joined HB Torshavn on a free transfer, signing a three-year deal with the Faroese club and returning to his country of birth after eleven years spent abroad.

International career
A former player of the U-17, U-19 and U-21 teams, Davidsen made his debut for the Faroese senior national team in a friendly against Iceland in 2013. He scored his first goal on 26 March 2019 against Romania in 4–1 away defeat for the UEFA Euro 2020 qualifying.

International goals
Scores and results list the Faroe Islands' goal tally first.

Honours
FC Fyn
Danish 2nd Division: 2011–12

Vejle
Danish 1st Division: 2017–18, 2019–20

References

External links

 

1991 births
Living people
People from Runavík
Faroese footballers
Faroe Islands international footballers
Faroese expatriate footballers
Faroe Islands youth international footballers
Association football defenders
Vejle Boldklub players
Danish Superliga players
NSÍ Runavík players
Odense Boldklub players
FC Fredericia players
Helsingborgs IF players
Havnar Bóltfelag players
Expatriate men's footballers in Denmark
Expatriate footballers in Sweden
Faroese expatriate sportspeople in Sweden